IESA may stand for

 Infogrames Entertainment, SA, a French publisher
 Instituto de Estudios Superiores de Administración, a Venezuelan business school
 Illinois Elementary School Association